Bachir Hani Abou Assi (born 23 February 1948) is a Lebanese wrestler. He competed in the 1972 Summer Olympics.

References

External links
 

1948 births
Living people
Wrestlers at the 1972 Summer Olympics
Lebanese male sport wrestlers
Olympic wrestlers of Lebanon